Herold is an unincorporated community in Braxton County, West Virginia, United States. Herold had a post office, which opened on September 3, 1891, and closed on December 23, 1984.

References

Unincorporated communities in Braxton County, West Virginia
Unincorporated communities in West Virginia